Leon Broekhof (born 14 May 1988) is a Dutch former professional footballer who played as a centre back.

Club career
He came through the Vitesse youth academy and played professionally for De Graafschap, Roda JC and SC Cambuur. In September 2013 he moved to FC Emmen on non-professional terms. In summer 2015, Broekhof joined FC Lienden from fellow amateur side Bennekom.

Broekhof signed for Sparta Nijkerk in April 2018. He retired from football after the 2019–20 season.

Honours
De Graafschap
 Eerste Divisie: 2009–10

References

External links
 Voetbal International

1988 births
Living people
People from Brummen
Association football defenders
Dutch footballers
De Graafschap players
Roda JC Kerkrade players
SC Cambuur players
FC Emmen players
Eredivisie players
Eerste Divisie players
Derde Divisie players
Vierde Divisie players
FC Lienden players
Sparta Nijkerk players
Footballers from Gelderland
21st-century Dutch people